Beth Carey (born ) is an Australian female volleyball player. She is part of the Australia women's national volleyball team and is the current Captain.

She participated in the 2014 FIVB Volleyball World Grand Prix.
On club level she played for South Australia in 2014 and VfB Suhl in 2016. She played for the Cignal HD Spikers in the Philippines in 2017.

References

External links
 Profile at FIVB.org

1990 births
Living people
Australian women's volleyball players
Place of birth missing (living people)
Expatriate volleyball players in Germany
Australian expatriate sportspeople in Germany
Australian expatriate sportspeople in the Philippines
Australian expatriate volleyball players
Expatriate volleyball players in the Philippines